Jeanne Geneviève Garnerin ( Labrosse; 7 March 1775 – 14 June 1847) was a French balloonist and parachutist.

Labrosse first flew on 10 November 1798, one of the earliest women to fly in a balloon. She was the wife of André-Jacques Garnerin, a hydrogen balloonist and inventor of the frameless parachute.

Biography
Jeanne Labrosse was amongst the crowd watching André-Jacques Garnerin's first hydrogen balloon flight and parachute descent at Parc Monceau, Paris, on 22 October 1797. She made his acquaintance, became his pupil, and flew with him on 10 November 1798, at Parc Monceau. She is sometimes described as the first woman in the world to fly in a balloon although Élisabeth Thible made a free flight in 1784, and Citoyenne Henri flew with Garnerin on 8 July 1798, four months earlier.

On 12 October 1799, Labrosse ascended in a gondola with a balloon before detaching the balloon and descending in the gondola by parachute, from an altitude of 900 meters. In doing so, she became the first woman to parachute. She went on to complete many ascents and parachute descents in towns across France and Europe.

Patent for parachute
On 11 October 1802, she filed a patent application on behalf of her husband for:
"a device called a parachute, intended to slow the fall of the basket after the balloon bursts. Its vital organs are a cap of cloth supporting the basket and a circle of wood beneath and outside of the parachute and used to hold it open while climbing: it must perform its task at the moment of separation from the balloon, by maintaining a column of air."Techno science – profile of André-Jacques Garnerin

Touring England
André-Jacques Garnerin held the position of Official Aeronaut of France and was unofficially known as the aérostatier des fêtes publiques, so the couple visited England in 1802 during the Peace of Amiens. They completed a number of demonstration flights, including his first flight ascending from the Volunteer Ground in North Audley Street, Grosvenor Square and a parachute descent to a field near St Pancras.  This gave rise to the popular English doggerel:
Bold Garnerin went up
Which increased his Repute
And came safe to earth
In his Grand Parachute.

Jeanne Garnerin accompanied him on his third flight over London. One of her parachute descents was estimated at 8,000 feet (2,438 m). When the war between France and Great Britain resumed in 1803, the couple were forced to leave England and return to France, where she continued to make flights and descents.Spartacus – History of Flight – Parachutes 

Family life
Garnerin's husband died in 1823. Garnerin later met French heroine Marie-Thérèse Figueur, Madame Sans-Gêne, who had fought in the French Revolutionary Wars and Napoleonic Wars, with whom she reportedly opened a table d'hôte restaurant.

Garnerin's niece, Élisa (Elizabeth), (born 1791), learned to fly balloons at age 15, and made 39 professional parachute descents from 1815 to 1836 in Italy, Spain, Russia, Germany and France.Aeronautics and Space Flight Collections by Catherine Scott, 1985Elizabeth Garnerin was especially popular in Italy, where she was hailed as the "Prima Aeroporista" (or First Parachutist) of France when she made her twenty-second and twenty-third descents in Milan (5 March and 5 April 1824). The crowds were delighted when she waved both French and Italian flags from the basket.

Commemoration
On 17 October 2006, the rue Jeanne Garnerin'' in Wissous, France, was named in her honour.

See also
 Citoyenne Henri – the first woman who accompanied André-Jacques Garnerin on a trip by balloon on 8 July 1798 from the Parc Monceau in Paris.
 Louis-Sébastien Lenormand – inventor and pioneer in parachuting.

Notes

References

Aviation pioneers
French aviators
1775 births
1847 deaths
French skydivers
French stunt performers
French balloonists
French women aviators
Women aviation pioneers